Siddhara is a small town in Arghakhanchi District in the Lumbini Zone of southern Nepal. At the time of the 1991 Nepal census it had a population of 7,126 and had 1182 houses in the town.

References

Populated places in Arghakhanchi District